The NCAA Division I Women's Outdoor Track and Field Championships are the annual collegiate track and field competitions for women athletes representing Division I institutions organised by the National Collegiate Athletic Association (NCAA). Athletes' performances in individual championships earn points for their institutions and the team with the most points receives the NCAA team title in track and field. A separate NCAA Division I men's competition is also held. These two events are separate from the NCAA Division I Women's Indoor Track and Field Championships and NCAA Division I Men's Indoor Track and Field Championships held during the winter. The first edition of the championship was held in 1982.

The current team champions are the Florida Gators, and the most successful team, with 14 titles, are the LSU Lady Tigers. LSU would be credited with a fifteenth title in 2012 but were disqualified when one of their athletes, Trinidadian athlete Semoy Hackett, tested positive for methylhexaneamine and was banned from international competition for two years and four months.

Events

Track events

Sprint events
100 meter dash (1982–present)
200 meter dash (1982–present)
400 meter dash (1982–present)
Distance events
800 meter run (1982–present)
1,500 meter run (1982–present)
3,000 meter steeplechase (2001–present)
5,000 meter run (1982–present)
10,000 meter run (1982–present)
Hurdle Events
100 meter hurdles (1982–present)
400 meter intermediate hurdles (1982–present)
Relay events
400 meter relay (1982–present)
1,600 meter relay (1982–present)

Field events

Jumping events
High jump (1982–present)
Pole vault (1998–present)
Long jump (1982–present)
Triple jump (1984–present)
Throwing events
Shot put (1982–present)
Discus throw (1982–present)
Hammer throw (1996–present)
Javelin throw (1982–present)
Multi-events
Heptathlon (1982–present)

Discontinued events
Discontinued events
3,000 meter run (1982–2000)

Team Champions

Results Table

† Title revoked due to positive drug tests.

Appearances

This list consists of the top twenty-seven women's college outdoor track and field teams in terms of appearances in the NCAA Division I Women's Outdoor Track and Field Championship. Although college rankings usually recognize top twenty-five teams, in this case there are seven teams tied for 21st: Illinois, North Carolina, Oklahoma, Purdue, Texas A&M, Villanova, and Washington.

Team titles

Championships records

See also
AIAW Intercollegiate Women's Outdoor Track and Field Champions
NCAA Men's Outdoor Track and Field Championship (Division I, Division II, Division III)
NCAA Women's Outdoor Track and Field Championship (Division II, Division III)
NCAA Men's Indoor Track and Field Championship (Division I, Division II, Division III)
NCAA Women's Indoor Track and Field Championships (Division I, Division II, Division III)
Pre-NCAA Outdoor Track and Field Champions

References

External links
NCAA Division I women's outdoor track and field
Past Results & Statistics

NCAA Women's Division I Outdoor Track and Field Championships
 Outdoor
Track Outdoor
Women's athletics competitions
NCAA Women's Outdoor Track and Field Championship